Jose Romero or José Romero may refer to:

José Romero y Fernández de Landa (1735-1807), Spanish naval officer
José Romero (bullfighter) (1745-1826), Spanish bullfighter
José Romero (baseball) (1878–?), Cuban baseball player
José E. Romero (1897–1978), Senator in the Philippines
Jose V. Romero Jr. (1934–2018), Filipino statesman and diplomat
José Romero Santos (born 1936), Cuban rower
Jose Manuel Romero Moreno (born 1940), Spanish lawyer
José Luis Romero (footballer) (born 1945), Spanish former footballer and coach
José María Romero de Tejada (1948-2017), Spanish jurist
José Santos Romero (born 1951), Argentine football manager and player
Jose Luis Romero Hicks (born 1957), Mexican businessperson
José Luis Romero (journalist) (1967–2010), Mexican radio journalist
Jose Romero (Australian footballer) (born 1971), Chilean Australian rules footballer
José Antonio Romero Morilla (born 1980), Spanish football manager
José Romero Jiménez (born 1985), Spanish football (soccer) player

See also
José Luis Romero (disambiguation)
Estadio José Pachencho Romero, a soccer stadium in Maracaibo, Venezuela